The Hazfi Cup 2007-08 is the 21st staging of Iran's football knockout competition. A record 103 clubs' entries were accepted for the competition. The tournament began on October 15, 2007.

The cup winner were guaranteed a place in the 2009 AFC Champions League.

Format

First stage
The first stage of the competition (first three rounds) consists of:
 24 clubs from the Azadegan League
 28 clubs from the 2nd Division
 29 clubs from the 3rd Division
 4 clubs from Karaj, Kish, Tehran and its suburbs

Second stage
The second stage of the competition (rounds four onward) consists of:
 18 clubs from the Iran Pro League
 16 clubs from the first stage of the competition

First round

Second round

Third round

Fourth Round (1/16 Final - Last 32)

Fifth Round (1/8 Final - Last 16)

Quarterfinals

Semifinals

Final

|}

Leg 1

Leg 2

Bracket

References

 Hazfi Cup first round results
 Hazfi Cup results
 Hazfi Cup second round results
 Steel Azin won; Tarbiat Yazd to face Esteghlal Tehran
 Rasoul Korbekandi's team out; Petroshimi to face Persepolis 
 Hazfi Cup; Foolad and Steel Azin won
 Hazfi Cup next matches schedule
 Hazfi Cup 1/16 and 1/8 Finals schedule

2007
Hazfi Cup, 2007-08
Hazfi Cup, 2007-08